Sara Marie Penton (born 15 November 1988) is a Swedish former professional racing cyclist, who rode professionally between 2016 and 2021 for the ,  and  teams.

Career
A former football player who retired from that sport at around 18 years old in 2006 due to medical issues with her knees, Penton started her first cycling race in 2013. She had begun to take cycling seriously for the first time in 2011 whilst working in a bike shop, completing the  Vätternrundan sportive the same year. In 2017, Penton won the Swedish National Road Race Championships, becoming the first rider other than Emma Johansson and Emilia Fahlin – neither of whom raced the 2017 edition – to win the race in seven years. Penton retired from competition at the end of the 2021 season.

Major results

2015
 9th Trofee Maarten Wynants
 9th Erondegemse Pijl
2017
 1st  Road race, National Road Championships
2018
 3rd Road race, National Road Championships

See also
 List of 2016 UCI Women's Teams and riders

References

External links
 

1988 births
Living people
Swedish female cyclists
Place of birth missing (living people)
20th-century Swedish women
21st-century Swedish women